Barach (Croatian And Serbian Barać And Barač) is an Americanized Serbian/Croatian surname.

Notable individuals with the surname:

People 
 Alvan Barach (1895–1977), American physician 
 Derek Barach (1995), American ice hockey player
 Jim Barach (1956), American politician and former weather broadcaster

References 

Croatian surnames
Serbian surnames
Americanized surnames